Upper Batley High School is a secondary school for boys located in Batley, West Yorkshire, England.

It was established by West Riding County Council in 1959 as Batley Boys High School. The school gained specialist status as a Business and Enterprise College in the 2000s and was renamed Batley Business and Enterprise College. The school was renamed Upper Batley High School in September 2015 and converted to academy status in April 2016.

Notable former pupils
Mark Eastwood, Conservative MP for Dewsbury
Carl Gibson, former professional rugby league footballer
Roy Powell, rugby league player 1965-98
Robert Palmer, singer/songwriter, best known for the top 10 hit "Addicted to love"

References

External links
Upper Batley High School official website

Secondary schools in Kirklees
Boys' schools in West Yorkshire
Batley
Educational institutions established in 1959
1959 establishments in England
Academies in Kirklees